Santhakra     is a village development committee in the Himalayas of Taplejung District in the Province No. 1 of north-eastern Nepal. At the time of the 2011 Nepal census it had a population of 2,594 people living in 533 individual households. There were 1,178 males and 1,416 females at the time of census.

References

External links
UN map of the municipalities of Taplejung District

Populated places in Taplejung District